A speedster is a character, primarily in superhero comics, whose powers primarily relate to superhuman speed (also known as superspeed). Primary abilities shared by all speedsters include running at speeds far in excess of human capability (to varying degrees) and resistance to the side effects (air resistance, inability to breathe, dynamic shock resulting from contact with objects at high speed, etc.) that result from such velocity. In almost all cases, speedsters can physically attack opponents by striking them at high speed, imparting great kinetic energy without themselves being harmed. A variety of other powers have been attributed to speedsters, depending on the story, their power's origin, and their universe's established continuity and rules.

Plausibility and artistic license
The use of speedsters in fiction requires artistic license due to the laws of physics that would prohibit such abilities.  Moving at the speed of sound, for example, would create sonic booms that are usually not heard in such stories, and generate substantial heat.  An enormous amount of energy would also be required to achieve such speeds, and Speedsters would need to consume massive amounts of calories to sustain their energy.

The Official Handbook of the Marvel Universe states that the character Nova maintains speeds which can be considered "modest", especially when carrying a passenger. It also concedes that a solid object moving in the Earth's atmosphere at several times the speed of sound or faster would wreak havoc on the planet, and that moving at such speeds would prohibit Northstar from breathing, while the generated wind/friction would ravage his body. On the other hand, it states that the character Quicksilver was born with adaptations that make high speeds possible, such as enhanced cardiovascular, respiratory, musculature, and digestive systems, a more efficient metabolism, better lubricated joints, tendons with the tensile strength of spring steel, unidentified bone composition that can withstand the dynamic shock of his touching the ground at speeds over 100 miles an hour, and a brain that can process information fast enough for him to react to his surroundings at high speed.

In DC Comics, the Flash family of speedsters derive their abilities from an extradimensional energy source known as the Speed Force, which grants them superspeed and various other abilities required to use it, such as durability. The Speed Force is a cosmic force based around velocity and movement and is the in-universe representation of reality in motion, being the very cosmic force that pushes space and time forward. However, the Speed Force is not the source from which other DC characters with superspeed get their powers. For example, Superman runs and flies quickly owing to his alien physiology, while Captain Marvel/Shazam and Wonder Woman are empowered by the gods.

Writer John Byrne maintained modest abilities for the speedster character Danny Hilltop in his series John Byrne's Next Men. Although Danny can keep pace with a race car, the friction generated by his speed melts any footwear he wears, burning his feet. Thus he runs barefoot, having toughened the soles of his feet through a regimen of pounding increasingly harder materials.

Other writers choose not to offer any scientific explanations for the questions raised by the actual use of such abilities. Peter David, whose run on the series Young Justice included the junior speedster Impulse, has opined that speedsters are inherently difficult to write: "Speedsters make me nervous, because if you play them accurately, they're impossible to beat ... I could deal with Impulse because he was easily distracted."

In other media

Speedster characters appear in other media such as film, video games, anime and manga, the most notable being the video game character Sonic the Hedgehog and supporting characters, and Looney Tunes characters Speedy Gonzales and the Road Runner.

Others include:
 Characters in the Dragon Ball franchise including Goku and Frieza.
 Kabal from the Mortal Kombat video game series.
 Daphne Millbrook from the NBC television superhero drama Heroes.
 Characters in the manga One-Punch Man, including Saitama, Flashy Flash, and Speed o' Sound Sonic.
 Dash Parr from the Pixar motion picture The Incredibles.
 Bree Davenport, the bionic hero from the Disney XD television series Lab Rats.
 Mr. Quick, a recurring character from the Disney XD television series Mighty Med.
 Billy "Kid Quick" Thunderman, a main character from the Nickelodeon television series The Thundermans.
 Characters in the comic book The Boys and its television adaptation, including A-Train, Shockwave, and Mister Marathon.
 Race Noble from the comic book Noble Causes.
 Josef / Red Rush from the comic book Invincible and its television adaptation.

References

 Speedster
Stock characters
Superhero fiction themes